Eutelia pyrastis is a species of moth in the family Euteliidae. It is found in the Caribbean Sea and North America.

The MONA or Hodges number for Eutelia pyrastis is 8968.1.

References

Further reading

 
 
 

Euteliinae
Articles created by Qbugbot
Moths described in 1905